is a Japanese female singer. She is the 20th Uta no Onēsan in the NHK series Okaasan to Issho. She was born in Kamakura, Kanagawa Prefecture.

Biography, personal life
Takumi Mitana is the youngest of three siblings. She learnt to play the piano from the age of three, and started singing vocals at high school.

She graduated from the Senzoku Gakuen College of Music Music Vocal Course in March 2009. While studying at the university, she passed the audition of Okaasan to Issho (NHK Educational TV), and from 20 March 2008 to 31 March 2016 played Uta no Onēsan of the twentieth generation.

Discography

Singles
"Donsuka Panpan Ōendan" 18 Mar 2009
"Yukidaruma no Rou" 7 Jan 2015

Albums
Okaasan to Issho: Saishin Best: Manmaru Smile 15 Oct 2008
Okaasan to Issho: Special 50 Selection 15 Jul 2009
Okaasan to Issho: Saishin Best: Bokura no Uta 21 Oct 2009
Okaasan to Issho: Saishin Best: Koronpa''' 20 Oct 2010Okaasan to Issho: Saishin Best: Sore ga Tomodachi 19 Oct 2011Okaasan to Issho: Saishin Best: Pan Papa Pan 17 Oct 2012

DVDNHK Okaasan to Issho Family Concert: Tomodachi Hajimete Hajimemashite! 6 Aug 2008NHK Okaasan to Issho Family Concert: Omatsuri Concert o Surikaero! 4 Feb 2009Okaasan to Issho Saishin Song Book: Atchikotchi March 15 Apr 2009NHK Okaasan to Issho Family Concert: Monoranmonoran Konichiwa! 5 Aug 2009NHK Okaasan to Issho Family Concert: Hoshizora no Merry-Go-Round -50 Shūnenkinen Concert- 3 Feb 2010Okaasan to Issho Saishin Song Book: Arigatō no Hana 21 Apr 2010NHK Okaasan to Issho Special Stage: Aozora Wonderland 2 Jun 2010NHK Okaasan to Issho Family Concert: Monoranmonoran to Kumo no Ki 4 Aug 2010NHK Okaasan to Issho Family Concert: Mori no Ongaku Restaurant 2 Feb 2011Okaasan to Issho Saishin Song Book: Dokonokonokinoko 20 Apr 2011NHK Okaasan to Issho Special Stage: Oideyo! Yume no Yuenchi 18 May 2011NHK Okaasan to Issho Family Concert: Pote iji ma e yōkoso!! 3 Aug 2011Okaasan to Issho Winter Special: Minna de Party! 2 Nov 2011NHK Okaasan to Issho Special Stage: Minna Issho ni! Fanfan Smile 21 Nov 2012
In addition, many appearances on Okaasan to Issho'' related DVD.

Okaasan to Issho concerts

References

External links
Takumi Mitani's profile and history from Oricon Celebrity Dictionary - Oricon Style 
The new Uta no Onēsan, "Gekimoe" active student musician! News -Oricon Style- 
Recochoku NHK Okaasan to Issho/Daisuke Yokoyama-Takumi Mitani song list 

Musicians from Kanagawa Prefecture
People from Kamakura
1986 births
Living people
Pony Canyon artists
21st-century Japanese singers
21st-century Japanese women singers